Mykola Ihorovych Skriabin (born 17 December 1978) is a Ukrainian alpine skier. He competed at the 1998, 2002 and the 2006 Winter Olympics. His younger sister, Anastasiya Skryabina, is also an Olympic alpine skier.

References

1978 births
Living people
Ukrainian male alpine skiers
Olympic alpine skiers of Ukraine
Alpine skiers at the 1998 Winter Olympics
Alpine skiers at the 2002 Winter Olympics
Alpine skiers at the 2006 Winter Olympics
Sportspeople from Lviv